Nebbiuno is a comune (municipality) in the Province of Novara in the Italian region of Piedmont, located about  northeast of Turin and about  north of Novara.

Nebbiuno borders the following municipalities: Armeno, Lesa, Massino Visconti, Meina, and Pisano.

Among the local churches are San Giorgio; Sant'Agata, Fosseno; San Leonardo, Tapigliano; Santi Nazaro e Celso, Corciago; and the Chiesetta della Madonna della Neve, Corciago.

Demographic evolution

References

Cities and towns in Piedmont